Harry Boone Porter Jr. (1923–1999) was an American Episcopal priest, liturgist, and editor of The Living Church magazine.

Born on January 10, 1923, in Louisville, Kentucky, Porter was an alumnus of St. Paul's School in Concord, New Hampshire. He received his bachelor's degree from Yale University in 1947 and his STB from the Berkeley Divinity School in 1950.

Porter was made deacon on April 12, 1950, and ordained to the priesthood on April 16, 1952. From 1950 until 1952, Porter was a fellow and tutor at the General Theological Seminary of the Episcopal Church, from which in 1952 he received an STM. He earned his DPhil from the University of Oxford in 1954. He taught ecclesiastical history at Nashotah House, 1954–1960, and he was Professor of Liturgics at General Seminary from 1960 until 1970.

He became editor of The Living Church magazine in 1977, retiring in 1990. In 1996, he received a master's degree in environmental studies from the Yale School of Forestry & Environmental Studies.

In addition to many other responsibilities in the Episcopal Church, Porter served on the Standing Liturgical Commission from 1961 to 1976, and the General Board of Examining Chaplains from 1970 to 1982. He was a member of Associated Parishes for Liturgy and Mission, the Anglican Society, the Alcuin Club, and the Living Church Foundation, Inc.

Porter died on June 5, 1999, in Bridgeport, Connecticut.

Published works
 The Day of Light: The Biblical and Liturgical Meaning of Sunday (1960)
 Samuel Seabury, Bishop in a New Nation (1962)
 Growth and Life in the Local Church (1968)
(Donald L. Garfield, editor) Towards a Living Liturgy: The Liturgy of the Lord's Supper Examined in Essays (1969, contributor)
 Keeping the Church Year (1977)
 Jeremy Taylor, Liturgist (1613–1667) (1979)
 A Song of Creation (1986)

References

External links
 New York Times Obituary
Bibliographic directory from Project Canterbury

1923 births
1999 deaths
20th-century American Episcopal priests
20th-century Anglican theologians
Alumni of the University of Oxford
American Episcopal theologians
American magazine editors
Anglican liturgists
Berkeley Divinity School alumni
Christians from Kentucky
Deaths from pneumonia in Connecticut
Editors of Christian publications
General Theological Seminary alumni
General Theological Seminary faculty
Nashotah House faculty
Religious leaders from Louisville, Kentucky
Writers from Louisville, Kentucky
Yale College alumni
Yale School of Forestry & Environmental Studies alumni
American expatriates in the United Kingdom